Anantpur is a village in Varanasi district in the Indian state of Uttar Pradesh. It is about 267 kilometers from the state capital Lucknow.

Demography
Anantpur has a total population of 1,140 people amongst 191 families. Sex ratio of Anantpur is 894 and child sex ratio is 1,165. Uttar Pradesh state average for both ratios is 912 and 902 respectively.

See also

References 

Villages in Varanasi district